Anil Kumar (born 1 March 1979) is an Indian wrestler who hails from Haryana. At the 2010 Commonwealth Games, he won a gold in the Men's Greco-Roman 96 kg's wrestling.

References 

Indian male sport wrestlers
Living people
Commonwealth Games gold medallists for India
Wrestlers at the 2010 Commonwealth Games
People from Sonipat
Sport wrestlers from Haryana
Wrestlers at the 2006 Asian Games
Wrestlers at the 2010 Asian Games
Commonwealth Games medallists in wrestling
1979 births
Asian Games competitors for India
21st-century Indian people
Medallists at the 2010 Commonwealth Games